Complete Stories (Seven Stories Press) is a 2017 collection of most of Kurt Vonnegut's previously published short stories, and several that were previously unpublished. The collection is introduced with a foreword by Dave Eggers, and is edited by Jerome Klinkowitz and Dan Wakefield.

This collection features 98 short stories:
 all from Bagombo Snuff Box (23), Look at the Birdie (14), and While Mortals Sleep (16)
 23/25 from Welcome to the Monkey House (except "Where I Live" and "New Dictionary")
 10/11 from Armageddon in Retrospect (except "Wailing Shall Be in All Streets")
 6/8 from Sucker's Portfolio (except "The Last Tasmanian" and "Robotville and Mr. Caslow")
 1 from Palm Sunday (only "The Big Space Fuck")
 5 never-before-published stories ("Atrocity Story," "City," "The Drone King," "Requiem for Zeitgeist," and "And on Your Left")

Contents

Part 1: War 
 All the King's Horses (Collier's Magazine, 10 February 1951; also in a collection Welcome to the Monkey House, 1968)
 D.P. (Ladies Home Journal, August 1953; also in a collection Welcome to the Monkey House, 1968)
 The Manned Missiles (Cosmopolitan, July 1958; also in a collection Welcome to the Monkey House, 1968)
 Thanasphere (Collier's Magazine, 2 September 1950; also in a collection Bagombo Snuff Box, 1999)
 Souvenir (Argosy Magazine, December 1952; also in a collection Bagombo Snuff Box, 1999)
 The Cruise of the Jolly Roger (Cape Cod Compass, April 1953; also in a collection Bagombo Snuff Box, 1999)
 Der Arme Dolmetscher (The Atlantic Monthly, July 1955; also in a collection Bagombo Snuff Box, 1999)
 Bagombo Snuff Box (Cosmopolitan Magazine, October 1954; also in a collection Bagombo Snuff Box, 1999)
 Great Day (Armageddon in Retrospect, 2008)
 Guns Before Butter (Armageddon in Retrospect, 2008)
 Happy Birthday 1951 (Armageddon in Retrospect, 2008)
 Brighten Up (Armageddon in Retrospect, 2008)
 The Unicorn Trap (Armageddon in Retrospect, 2008)
 Spoils (Armageddon in Retrospect, 2008)
 Just You and Me, Sammy (Armageddon in Retrospect, 2008)
 The Commandant's Desk (Armageddon in Retrospect, 2008)
 Armageddon in Retrospect (Armageddon in Retrospect, 2008)
 The Petrified Ants (Look at the Birdie, 2009)
 Atrocity Story (never-before-published)

Part 2: Women 
 Miss Temptation (The Saturday Evening Post, 21 April 1956; also in a collection Welcome to the Monkey House, 1968)
 Little Drops of Water (Look at the Birdie, 2009)
 Jenny (While Mortals Sleep, 2011)
 The Epizootic (While Mortals Sleep, 2011)
 Hundred-Dollar Kisses (While Mortals Sleep, 2011)
 Ruth (While Mortals Sleep, 2011)
 Out, Brief Candle (While Mortals Sleep, 2011)
 Mr. Z (While Mortals Sleep, 2011)
 With His Hand on the Throttle (While Mortals Sleep, 2011)
 Eden by the River (Sucker's Portfolio, 2013)
 Lovers Anonymous (Redbook Magazine, October 1963; also in a collection Bagombo Snuff Box, 1999)

Part 3: Science 
 Next Door (Cosmopolitan Magazine, April 1955; also in a collection Welcome to the Monkey House, 1968)
 Report on the Barnhouse Effect (Collier's Magazine, 11 February 1950; also in a collection Welcome to the Monkey House, 1968)
 The Euphio Question (Collier's Magazine, 12 May 1951; also in a collection Welcome to the Monkey House, 1968)
 Unready to Wear (Galaxy Science Fiction Magazine, April 1953; also in a collection Welcome to the Monkey House, 1968)
 EPICAC (Collier's Magazine, 26 November 1950; also in a collection Welcome to the Monkey House, 1968)
 Mnemonics (Collier's Magazine, 28 April 1951; also in a collection Bagombo Snuff Box, 1999)
 Confido (Look at the Birdie, 2009)
 Hall of Mirrors (Look at the Birdie, 2009)
 The Nice Little People (Look at the Birdie, 2009)
 Look at the Birdie (Look at the Birdie, 2009)
 Between Time and Timbuktu (Sucker's Portfolio, 2013)

Part 4: Romance 
 Who Am I This Time? (The Saturday Evening Post, 16 December 1961; also in a collection Welcome to the Monkey House, 1968)
 Long Walk to Forever (Ladies Home Journal, August 1960; also in a collection Welcome to the Monkey House, 1968)
 A Night for Love (The Saturday Evening Post, 23 November 1957; also in a collection Bagombo Snuff Box, 1999)
 Find Me a Dream (Cosmopolitan Magazine, February 1961; also in a collection Bagombo Snuff Box, 1999)
 FUBAR (Look at the Birdie, 2009)
 Girl Pool (While Mortals Sleep, 2011)
 Rome (Sucker's Portfolio, 2013)
 Miss Snow, You're Fired (Sucker's Portfolio, 2013)
 Paris, France (Sucker's Portfolio, 2013)
 City (never-before-published)

Part 5: Work Ethic versus Fame and Fortune 
 More Stately Mansions (Collier's Magazine, 22 December 1951; also in a collection Welcome to the Monkey House, 1968)
 The Hyannis Port Story (Welcome to the Monkey House, 1968)
 Go Back to Your Precious Wife and Son (Ladies Home Journal, July 1962; also in a collection Welcome to the Monkey House, 1968)
 The Lie (The Saturday Evening Post, 24 February 1962; also in a collection Welcome to the Monkey House, 1968)
 Deer in the Works (Esquire Magazine, April 1955; also in a collection Welcome to the Monkey House, 1968)
 Any Reasonable Offer (Collier's Magazine, 19 January 1952; also in a collection Bagombo Snuff Box, 1999)
 The Package (Collier's Magazine, 26 July 1952; also in a collection Bagombo Snuff Box, 1999)
 Poor Little Rich Town (Collier's Magazine, 25 October 1952; also in a collection Bagombo Snuff Box, 1999)
 A Present for Big Saint Nick (Argosy Magazine, December 1954; also in a collection Bagombo Snuff Box, 1999)
 This Son of Mine (The Saturday Evening Post, 18 August 1956; also in a collection Bagombo Snuff Box, 1999)
 Hal Irwin's Magic Lamp (Cosmopolitan Magazine, June 1957; also in a collection Bagombo Snuff Box, 1999)
 Shout About It from the Housetops (Look at the Birdie, 2009)
 Ed Luby's Key Club (Look at the Birdie, 2009)
 King and Queen of the Universe (Look at the Birdie, 2009)
 $10,000 a Year, Easy (While Mortals Sleep, 2011)
 Money Talks (While Mortals Sleep, 2011)
 While Mortals Sleep (While Mortals Sleep, 2011)
 Tango (While Mortals Sleep, 2011)
 The Humbugs (While Mortals Sleep, 2011)

Part 6: Behavior 
 The Foster Portfolio (Collier's Magazine, 8 September 1951; also in a collection Welcome to the Monkey House, 1968)
 Custom-made Bride (The Saturday Evening Post, 27 March 1954; also in a collection Bagombo Snuff Box, 1999)
 Unpaid Consultant (Cosmopolitan Magazine, March 1955; also in a collection Bagombo Snuff Box, 1999)
 Sucker's Portfolio (Sucker's Portfolio, 2013)
 The Drone King (never-before-published)
 Hello, Red (Look at the Birdie, 2009)
 The Honor of a Newsboy (Look at the Birdie, 2009)
 Tom Edison's Shaggy Dog (Collier's Magazine, 14 March 1953; also in a collection Welcome to the Monkey House, 1968)
 The Man Without No Kiddleys (While Mortals Sleep, 2011)
 The Powder-Blue Dragon (Cosmopolitan Magazine, November 1954; also in a collection Bagombo Snuff Box, 1999)
 Runaways (The Saturday Evening Post, 15 April 1961; also in a collection Bagombo Snuff Box, 1999)
 The Good Explainer (Look at the Birdie, 2009)
 Guardian of the Person (While Mortals Sleep, 2011)
 Bomar (While Mortals Sleep, 2011)
 Requiem for Zeitgeist (never-before-published)
 And on Your Left (never-before-published)

Part 7: The Band Director 
 The Kid Nobody Could Handle (The Saturday Evening Post, 24 September 1955; also in a collection Welcome to the Monkey House, 1968)
 The No-Talent Kid (The Saturday Evening Post, 25 October 1952; also in a collection Bagombo Snuff Box, 1999)
 Ambitious Sophomore (The Saturday Evening Post, May 1954; also in a collection Bagombo Snuff Box, 1999)
 The Boy Who Hated Girls (The Saturday Evening Post, 31 March 1956; also in a collection Bagombo Snuff Box, 1999)
 A Song for Selma (Look at the Birdie, 2009)

Part 8: Futuristic 
 Harrison Bergeron (The Magazine of Fantasy and Science Fiction, October 1961; also in a collection Welcome to the Monkey House, 1968)
 Welcome to the Monkey House (Playboy Magazine, January 1968; also in a collection Welcome to the Monkey House, 1968)
 Adam (Cosmopolitan Magazine, April 1954; also in a collection Welcome to the Monkey House, 1968)
 Tomorrow and Tomorrow and Tomorrow (Galaxy Science Fiction Magazine, January 1954; also in a collection Welcome to the Monkey House, 1968)
 The Big Space Fuck (Again, Dangerous Visions, 1972; also collected in Palm Sunday, 1981)
 2 B R 0 2 B (Worlds of If Magazine, January 1962; also in a collection Bagombo Snuff Box, 1999)
 Unknown Soldier (Armageddon in Retrospect, 2008)

2017 short story collections
Short story collections by Kurt Vonnegut
Works by Kurt Vonnegut
Seven Stories Press books